Dennis Lisk (born 1977 in Hamburg), also known as Denyo, Denyo 77, Dennis Deutschland and Dennis Dubplate, is a German soul and hip hop musician and radio presenter. He was also host of the German television series Cover My Song.

Music career 
Lisk started his music career in the 1990s in the band formation Absolute Beginner (later just Beginner) that released three albums, Flashnizm (1996), Bambule (1998) and Blast Action Heroes (2003). The latter, their most successful, peaked at #1 in German Albums Chart and reached #3 in the Ö3 Austria Top 40 Albums Chart. They were signed to Universal with main members with Dennis Lisk as Denyo, Jan Delay (Eißfeldt) and DJ Mad. Other members were DJ Burn, rappers Nabil Sheikh, Mirko and Platin Martin.

While in the band, he released Minidsico in 2001 under the name Denyo77. It included self-produced tracks as well as collaborations from Eißfeldt 65, Glammerlicious, Milan and DJ Dynamite and featuring Eißfeldt 65 (also known as Hans Werner Votz), DJ Mad an den Cuts, Illo, Paolo 77, D-Flame and Das Bo. Also starting 2001, he worked in anti-racism project Brothers Keepers, in a collective of many artists from various genres (hip hop, reggae, soul), that included Xavier Naidoo, D-Flame, Ziggy Marley, Patrice, Gentleman, Torch. His single from the album "Irgendwie, Irgendwo, Irgendwann" was Top 5 in Germany, Austria and Switzerland.

His second album, released in 2005 was titled The Denyos and was produced by Tropf, DJ Dynamited, Lars Mellow and Chris Tall and tracks featuring Eizi Eiz, Ms Marx and DJ Mad an den Cuts. One single was released titled "Ain't No Punchline When He's Gone".

In July 2009, he released the solo album Suchen & Finden with contract signed with Four Music.

Radio and television 
Dennis Lisk has also built a radio and television career. Once a week, he hosts Top of the Blogs on Hamburg radio station N-Joy. In 2011, he also hosted the inaugural season of Cover My Song, a television series bringing together artists from pop music and from hip hop / rap to "remake" known hits of each other in a bid for generating crossover modern hit interpretations. The program has won German Television Awards.

Personal life 
Lisk is married and has two children, a son and a daughter.

Discography 

with Absolute Beginner / Beginner
 1996: Flashnizm [Buback]
 1998: Bambule [Universal]
 2000: Boombule (Bambule Remixed) [Universal]
 2003: Blast Action Heroes [Universal]
 2016: Advanced Chemistry [Universal]

Solo albums

Singles 

Song releases
 1997 – "Ich und Ich" feat. Station 17 (Me, myself & I)
 1998 – "Kein Thema" feat. Andi (Urban (Universal)) (No problem/No issue)
 1999 – "Styleliga No.2" (Eimsbush) (Styleleague No.2)
 2001 – "Single Sells" (Universal)
 2001 – "Was Nun" (Universal) (What now?)
 2001 – "Traumtrio" feat. Paolo 77 & Illo 77 (Dreamtrio)
 2005 – "The Denyos" (Universal)
 2005 – "The Denyos" (Juice Exclusive – CD #55)
 200x – "Easy" feat. Nico Suave – released online
 2006 – "Hart aber izzo" feat. Torch (Juice – CD #63) (Hard but izzo)

References

External links 

 Denyo at laut.de

Living people
1977 births
German rappers
Hamburg hip hop
Musicians from Hamburg